Alex Bale is an American actor, filmmaker, director, and YouTuber.

Works

Films
In 2014, Bale co-wrote “S–Laughter (It’s French)”. It was played at the DC Independent Film Festival.

In 2016, while in high school, Bale made a YouTube series called "Promos". Throughout 2017-2018, Bale made a comedic alternate reality game on YouTube called "Pizza Time Pizza". It is a sequel to Promos.

In 2016, Bale co-wrote “Countdown”. It was played at the DC Independent Film Festival.

In 2019, Bale started a series on YouTube called "Horror Shorts". Among them were "THE UMBRELLA MAN (2019)" and "Don't Drink the Coffee (2019)".

In 2020, Bale started a series called "SpongeBob Conspiracies". Bale's YouTube channel received substantial growth due to the series. SpongeBob Conspiracies was part of a larger alternate reality game called "The Muse ARG" or "Don't Feed The Muse". Throughout 2021-2023, Bale developed the ARG. It gained a small following of ~5000 players.

In 2021, Bale released a comedic short film "WHAT THE HECK IS GOING ON?". It was played at the Atlanta Underground Film Festival. The film won Best Actress Comedy, Best Director Comedy, and Best Script Comedy at the 8th Annual NYC Short Comedy Film Festival.

Other
Throughout 2014-2016, Bale worked on a Minecraft ARG called "OldRoot".

In 2018, Bale made a rap video about the "Air Bud cinematic universe".

External links
 Alex Bale Films

References

Living people
21st-century American actors
American filmmakers
American YouTubers
Year of birth missing (living people)